Israel was represented in the Eurovision Song Contest 2003 by Lior Narkis with the song "Words for Love", with lyrics in Hebrew, English, Greek, French and Spanish.

Before Eurovision

Artist selection 
On 15 November 2002, IBA announced that Lior Narkis was selected by a special committee as the Israeli representative for the Eurovision Song Contest 2003. Among artists considered by the selection committee, David D'Or was highly considered before Narkis was ultimately selected. Among the members of the committee were Yoav Ginay, Nili Carmel-Yonatan, Jojo Abutbul, Margalit Tzan'ani, Shalva Berti, Yankele Mendel, Eran Hadas and Izchak Sonnenschein.

Kdam Eurovision 2003 
The song that Lior Narkis represented Israel with in Riga was selected through a national final called Kdam Eurovision 2003. 250 songs were submitted by composers, which were subsequently evaluated by Narkis that selected four songs. The song titles were announced on 2 January 2003. 

The final took place on 23 January 2003 at the Ha'Oman 17 Nightclub in Jerusalem, hosted by Eden Harel and broadcast on Channel 1. All four competing songs were performed by Lior Narkis, and the winning song "Milim La'Ahava" was selected by a combination of the votes from an expert jury of IBA representatives (40%) and votes from the public (60%).

At Eurovision
Israel performed 13th at the 2003 Contest, following Spain and preceding Netherlands. After the voting concluded, Israel scored 17 points, placing 19th.

Voting

References

2003
Countries in the Eurovision Song Contest 2003
Eurovision